Christa Dichgans (1940-2018) was a German painter, associated with the Pop Art movement.

Biography
Dichgans was born in Berlin, Germany in 1940 and studied painting at the Hochschule der Künste, Berlin and the German National Academic Foundation (Studienstiftung des Deutschen Volkes).

In 1966 she received a scholarship from the German National Academic Foundation and moved to New York City, returning to Europe to live in Rome the following year.  From 1972 on she lived in Berlin and La Haute Carpénée in the south of France.  Between 1984 and 1988, she worked as assistant to Georg Baselitz at the Hochschule der Künste, Berlin.

Dichgans died in 2018 in Berlin.

Public collections
Her work is held in a number of public collections including:
Kirchliches Museen Würzburg
Kunstmuseum Bonn
Kunstverein Schloß Wertingen
Neue Nationalgalerie. Berlin
Sammlung des Deutschen Bundestages, Berlin
Städtische Galerie Viersen

See also
 List of German painters

References

External links
Christa Dichgans on ArtFacts

1940 births
2018 deaths
Artists from Berlin
20th-century German painters
21st-century German painters
German women painters
German pop artists
20th-century German women artists
21st-century German women artists